The 2015 Island Games in Jersey was the fourteenth edition in which an association football tournament was played at the multi-games competition.

Participants
The tournament involved 11 teams, the most women's football teams in the games' history.

Games

Group A

Group B

Group C

Placement play-off matches

9th place match

7th place match

5th place match

Final stage

Bracket

Semi-finals

Third place match

Final

Final rankings

See also
Men's Football at the 2015 Island Games
Football at the 2015 Island Games

References

2015
Women
Island